Cerani is a village in the municipality of Derventa, Bosnia and Herzegovina.

References

Villages in Republika Srpska
Populated places in Derventa